Jack O'Dell (born Hunter Pitts O'Dell, August 11, 1923 – October 31, 2019) was an African-American activist writer and communist, best known for his role in the civil rights movement of the 1950s and 1960s.

Early life
O'Dell was born in Detroit, Michigan, in August 1923. He was raised there by his grandfather, a janitor at a public library, and his grandmother, who was a strict Catholic. O'Dell attended an all-black college, Xavier University of Louisiana in New Orleans, from 1941 until 1943.  During World War II, he served in the U.S. Merchant Marines, which functioned as a branch of the military forces for the duration of the conflict.  During this time, he joined the National Maritime Union, one of the few racially integrated labor unions in the U.S.

Communist Party USA
During the 1950s, O'Dell was a member of the Communist Party USA (CPUSA).

Martin Luther King Jr. and the civil rights movement
He worked with Martin Luther King Jr.  O'Dell was a director of the Southern Christian Leadership Conference (SCLC).  Because of O'Dell's past involvement with the Communist Party, King received pressure from many liberal leaders, including the Kennedy brothers John and Robert, to distance himself from O'Dell. Taylor Branch, a historian of the Civil Rights Era, remarked that it was ultimately the Kennedy administration that influenced King's decision, not a reflection of King's own feelings towards O'Dell.

After conferring with King, O'Dell decided to accept a less prominent post within the movement not to alienate important allies of the Civil Rights struggle, but O'Dell continued to play a decisive role in the SCLC as well as in King's move towards the political left towards the end of his life.

Jesse Jackson
O'Dell worked closely with Jesse Jackson as a senior foreign policy advisor to the "Jesse Jackson for President" campaign in 1984. He also worked with Jackson as an international affairs consultant to the National Rainbow Coalition.

Later life and death
O'Dell wrote for Freedomways, an African-American political journal, from its beginning in 1961 to its end in 1985. He served as chairman of the board of the Pacifica Foundation, which operates the listener-sponsored Pacifica Radio Network, from 1977 to 1997.

He lived with his wife, Jane Power, in Vancouver, British Columbia, Canada. In later life he was active in mentoring new generations of political activists—as well as historians of the Civil Rights Movement—in the Pacific Northwest.

A documentary film was made about O'Dell called The Issue of Mr. O’Dell (2018) that was directed and produced by Rami Katz.

O'Dell died in October 2019 at the age of 96.

References

Other resources
Kenneth R. Timmerman. Shakedown: Exposing the real Jesse Jackson (2002).  Regnery Publishing, Inc.
Diane McWhorter. Carry Me Home: Birmingham, Alabama, the Climactic Battle of the Civil Rights Revolution (2001).  Simon & Schuster.  
Michael Zweig, ed.  Jack O'Dell: The Urgency of Now (2005).  State University of New York, Stony Brook, Department of Economics.

External links
Seven Questions: Jack O'Dell and Jane Power. Retrieved January 28, 2006

African-American activists
Activists for African-American civil rights
American anti-racism activists
Activists from Detroit
African-American non-fiction writers
Pacifica Foundation people
Members of the Communist Party USA
United States Merchant Mariners of World War II
African Americans in World War II
Military personnel from Detroit
1923 births
2019 deaths
African-American Catholics
Roman Catholic activists